Hydroxy-1,4-benzoquinone, also called hydroxy-para-benzoquinone, is an organic compound with formula , formally derived from 1,4-Benzoquinone by replacing one hydrogen atom with a hydroxyl (OH) group.  It is one of three hydroxybenzoquinone isomers and one of the simplest hydroxyquinones.

The compound is often called 2-hydroxy-1,4-benzoquinone, but the "2-" prefix is superfluous since there is no other hydroxy derivative of 1,4-benzoquinone.  The IUPAC name is 2-hydroxycyclohexa-2,5-diene-1,4-dione.

It is formed by the reaction of 1,4-benzoquinone with hydrogen peroxide and is a byproduct of the metabolism of phenols, such as 1,2,4-benzenetriol.   The enzyme 1,2,4-benzenetriol dehydrogenase catalyzes the conversion of 1,2,4-benzenetriol to 2-hydroxy-1,4-benzoquinone, and the enzyme hydroxybenzoquinone reductase catalyzes the reverse reaction.  The enzyme 2-hydroxy-1,4-benzoquinone-2-reductase converts it to 1,4-benzoquinone.

It tends to dimerize spontaneously by peroxo bridges.

See also
 Tetrahydroxy-1,4-benzoquinone

References

1,4-Benzoquinones
Hydroxybenzoquinones